Voyageur is the fourth studio album by Canadian singer-songwriter Kathleen Edwards, released on January 17, 2012. The album was produced by Edwards and Justin Vernon of Bon Iver. Voyageur reached the 39th position on the US Billboard 200 chart, becoming Edwards' first top 100 and top 40 album in the US, and her first top ten album in Canada, peaking at number two.

In addition to Edwards' regular backing band, guest musicians on the album include Francis and the Lights, Norah Jones, The Good Lovelies, Stornoway, John Roderick, Phil Cook of Megafaun, S. Carey and Afie Jurvanen.

The album was named as a longlisted nominee for the 2012 Polaris Music Prize on June 14, 2012, and later listed as one of the 10 shortlisted nominees for the prize on July 17.

Track listing
All songs written by Kathleen Edwards except as noted.
 "Empty Threat" – 3:37
 "Chameleon/Comedian" – 4:41
 "A Soft Place to Land" (Kathleen Edwards, John Roderick) – 4:25
 "Change the Sheets" – 4:30
 "House Full of Empty Rooms" – 3:01
 "Mint" – 4:52
 "Sidecar" (Kathleen Edwards, Jim Bryson) – 2:38
 "Pink Champagne" (Kathleen Edwards, John Roderick) – 5:09
 "Going to Hell" – 4:18
 "For the Record" – 7:06

Chart performance

References

2012 albums
Kathleen Edwards albums